Spottiswoode is a surname of Scottish origin. It was first used by Robert de Spottiswoode and his descendants. Notable people with the surname include:

 Alicia Ann Spottiswoode (1810–1900), Scottish songwriter
 Andrew Spottiswoode (1787–1866), British politician
 Frank Spottiswoode, English professional rugby league footballer
 Frank Spottiswoode Aitken (1868–1933), Scottish-American silent film actor
 John Spottiswoode (1565–1633), Archbishop of St Andrews
 Jonathan Spottiswoode (born 1964), British musician, writer, and filmmaker
 Roger Spottiswoode (born 1945), Canadian-British film director and screenwriter
 William Spottiswoode, FRS (1825–1883), English mathematician and physicist, son of Andrew

References

Surnames of Scottish origin